Pedioplanis lineoocellata, known commonly as the common sand lizard, the ocellated sand lizard, and the spotted sand lizard, is a species of lizard in the family Lacertidae. The species is endemic to Southern Africa. There are three recognized subspecies.

Geographic range
P. lineoocellata is found in Botswana, Namibia, and South Africa.

Description
The "window" in the lower eyelid is composed of two transparent scales, which are edged with black.

Reproduction
P. lineoocellata is oviparous. The adult female lays a clutch of 4–8 eggs.

Subspecies
Three subspecies of P. lineoocellata are recognized as being valid, including the nominotypical subspecies.
Pedioplanis lineoocellata inocellata 
Pedioplanis lineoocellata lineoocellata  
Pedioplanis lineoocellata pulchella 

Nota bene: A trinomial authority in parentheses indicates that the subspecies was originally described in a genus other than Pedioplanis.

References

Further reading
Duméril AMC, Bibron G (1839). Erpétologie générale ou Histoire naturelle complète des Reptiles. Tome cinquième [Volume 5]. Paris: Roret. viii + 854 pp. (Eremias lineo-ocellata, new species, pp. 314–316). (in French).
Gray JE (1845). Catalogue of the Specimens of Lizards in the Collection of the British Museum. London: Trustees of the British Museum. (Edward Newman, printer). xxviii + 289 pp. (Eremias pulchella, new species, p. 42).
Kirchhof S, Hipsley CA, Corl A, Dell'Mour H, Müller J (2014). "Pedioplanis lineoocellata lineoocellata (Duméril & Bibron 1839) Spotted Sand Lizard". African Herp News (61): 28–30.
Mertens R (1955). "Die Amphibien und Reptilien Südwestafrikas. Aus den Ergebnissen einer im Jahre 1952 ausgeführten Reise". Abhandlung der Senckenbergischen Naturforschenden Gesellschaft, Frankfurt (490): 1–172. (Eremias lineoocellata inocellata, new subspecies). (in German).
Tolley KA, Daniels RJ, Feldheim KA (2014). "Characterisation of microsatellite markers in the Spotted Sand Lizard (Pedioplanis lineoocellata) shows low levels of inbreeding and moderate genetic diversity on a small spatial scale". African Journal of Herpetology 63 (2): 87–97.

Pedioplanis
Lacertid lizards of Africa
Reptiles of Botswana
Reptiles of Namibia
Reptiles of South Africa
Reptiles described in 1839
Taxa named by André Marie Constant Duméril
Taxa named by Gabriel Bibron